This is a list of the 200 members of the Swiss National Council for the 2007–2011 legislative term.

The elections were held on October 21, 2007 and the first session of Parliament will open on December 3, 2007. Some changes occurred as a result of the second round of Council of States elections.

Presidency

Elections for 2010/2011 are held in December 2010. Traditionally the previous term's first vice-president is elected president.

The 200 current members
This list is current as of December 6, 2008.

Retired or deceased members

See also
 List of members of the Swiss National Council (2003-2007)
 Political parties of Switzerland for the abbreviations
 List of members of the Swiss Council of States

Notes and references 
 The data are from the website of the Swiss Federal Assembly.

2007